Noventa may refer to one of the following Italian communes:

Noventa di Piave, in the province of Venice
Noventa Padovana, in the province of Padua
Noventa Vicentina, in the province of Vicenza